Couverture, the French word for "cover", may refer to:

 Couverture chocolate, a high-quality grade of chocolate 
 Couverture maladie universelle, a French public health programme 
 Coverture, also spelled couverture, a doctrine in common law relating to a wife's legal status